The Mug Race is an annual sailing race held on St. Johns River in the US state of Florida.  Billed as the "World's Longest River Race", the course starts in Palatka and ends in Jacksonville.  To compete, masts must be under 44 feet in order to clear all bridges along the course.  The Mug Cup is awarded to the first boat to complete the 38.5 mile course from the starting line at Memorial Bridge to the finish line at Buckman Bridge. Additionally, there are over 100 class specific trophies

Mug Cup winners

External links
 The Rudder Club

References

1954 establishments in Florida
Recurring sporting events established in 1954
Sailing competitions in the United States
Sailing in Florida
Sports competitions in Florida
Sports competitions in Jacksonville, Florida
Tourist attractions in Putnam County, Florida
Tourist attractions in Palatka, Florida
Yachting races
St. Johns River